John Theodore Merz (30 March 1840 – 21 March 1922) was a German British chemist, historian and industrialist. Merz was born in Manchester, England and educated at University of Giessen, Göttingen, Heidelberg, and Bonn universities.

Merz was vice-chairman of the Newcastle-upon-Tyne Electric Supply Company, which he founded in 1889. He was chairman of the Tyneside Tramways and Tramroads Company and a member of the senate of Durham University. In 1906, he was awarded an LLD degree from the University of Aberdeen.

The author of philosophical works on Leibniz, and Religion and Science (1915), his four volume History of European Thought in the Nineteenth Century consummated William Whewell's History of the Inductive Sciences (1837) and The Philosophy of the Inductive Sciences, Founded Upon Their History (1840) as well as William Stanley Jevons' Principles of Science (1874). Merz' first two volumes describe the development of mathematical and scientific thought, and the final two volumes depict the development of philosophy. Merz stated the following with reference to his history:

It is the object of these volumes to fix, if possible, this possession; to rescue from oblivion that which appears to me our secret property; in the last and dying hour of a remarkable age to throw the light upon the fading outlines of its mental life; to try to trace them, and with the aid of all possible information, gained from the written testimonies or the records of others, to work them into a coherent picture, which may give to those who follow some idea of the peculiar manner in which our age looked upon the world and life, how it intellectualised and spiritualised them.J. T. Merz, A History of European Thought in the Nineteenth Century. Vol. I (Edinburgh: William Blackwood and Sons, 1907), p. 13.

It was Merz's objective to write this history of thought from the point of view of one who shared in the progress and watched many of the changes and movements, and to set out the inner life of his contemporaries and the secret springs of their judgements and opinions.

His mathematical library known as the Merz Collection is held by Newcastle University. It consists of 4000 volumes, including works on philosophy, European history and German Literature. The university's Merz Court was named after the Merz family.

Merz was buried in Elswick, St John's Cemetery.

His son, Charles Hesterman Merz, was a successful electrical engineer who pioneered the use of high-voltage three-phase AC power distribution in the United Kingdom.

References

External links
 
 John Theodore Merz (1840–1922), Chemist, Historian and Industrialist Oil on canvas portrait by unknown artist from the BBC

1840 births
1922 deaths
19th-century English chemists
English Quakers
19th-century German chemists
University of Bonn alumni
English people of German descent
German Quakers
19th-century English historians
19th-century German historians
Businesspeople from Manchester